In enzymology, a 6-aminohexanoate-dimer hydrolase is an enzyme that catalyzes the chemical reaction N-(6-aminohexanoyl)-6-aminohexanoate + H2O  2 6-aminohexanoate. Thus, the two substrates of this enzyme are N-(6-aminohexanoyl)-6-aminohexanoate and H2O, whereas its product is two molecules of 6-aminohexanoate.

This enzyme belongs to the family of hydrolases, those acting on carbon-nitrogen bonds other than peptide bonds, specifically in linear amides. The systematic name of this enzyme class is N-(6-aminohexanoyl)-6-aminohexanoate amidohydrolase. This enzyme is also called 6-aminohexanoic acid oligomer hydrolase.

Structural studies

See also 
Nylon-eating bacteria

References 
 

EC 3.5.1
Enzymes of known structure